Caleb Stark (December 3, 1759 – August 28, 1838) was an American state senator. He was the eldest son of General John Stark and his wife Molly Stark.

Biography
He was born December 3, 1759, at Dunbarton, New Hampshire. During the American Revolutionary War Caleb served with his father in the 1st New Hampshire Regiment at the Battle of Bunker Hill, Trenton and Princeton as an Ensign. After his father resigned his commission Caleb remained in the Continental Army, serving the rest of the war and rising to the rank of major. He served in the New Hampshire Senate from 1818 to 1819. He died on August 28, 1838.

See also
New Hampshire Historical Marker No. 187: Suncook Village

References

Bibliography
John Stark, Freedom Fighter; by Robert P. Richmond.  Waterbury, Conn. : Dale Books, 1976.
Reminiscences of the French War; containing Rogers' Expeditions with the New-England Rangers under his command, as published in London in 1765; with notes and illustrations. : To which is added an account of the life and military services of Maj. Gen. John Stark; with notices and anecdotes of other officers distinguished in the French and Revolutionary wars.—Concord, N.H. : Published by Luther Roby., 1831.
Frederic Kidder, History of the First New Hampshire Regiment in the War of the Revolution (Albany, 1868), 121-124; 
Robert P. Richmond, John Stark, Freedom Fighter (Waterbury, 1976); 
Luther Roby, Reminiscences of the French War; containing Rogers’ Expeditions with the New-England Rangers under his command, as published in London in 1765; with notes and illustrations. : To which is added an account of the life and military services of Maj. Gen. John Stark; with notices and anecdotes of other officers distinguished in the French and Revolutionary wars (Concord, 1831); 
Selected Wartime Service Records of Major Caleb Stark.

1759 births
1838 deaths
Continental Army officers from New Hampshire
People from Dunbarton, New Hampshire
People of colonial New Hampshire
People of New Hampshire in the American Revolution